The arrondissement of Mende is an arrondissement of France in the Lozère department in the Occitanie région. Its INSEE code is 482 and its capital city, and prefecture of the department, is Mende.

The only important city is Mende with 12,318 people living there in 2019. Other towns are Marvejols (4,684) and Saint-Chély-d'Apcher (4,211).

Geography
The arrondissement covers the northern part of the department and is bordered to the north and east by the Auvergne-Rhône-Alpes region (the Cantal department to the northwest, the Haute-Loire department to the northeast and the Ardèche department to the east), to the south by the arrondissement of Florac and to the west by the Aveyron department.

Composition

The arrondissement of Mende has 114 communes; they are (with their INSEE codes):

 Albaret-le-Comtal (48001)
 Albaret-Sainte-Marie (48002)
 Allenc (48003)
 Altier (48004)
 Antrenas (48005)
 Arzenc-d'Apcher (48007)
 Arzenc-de-Randon (48008)
 Auroux (48010)
 Badaroux (48013)
 Balsièges (48016)
 Banassac-Canilhac (48017)
 Barjac (48018)
 La Bastide-Puylaurent (48021)
 Bel-Air-Val-d'Ance (48038)
 Les Bessons (48025)
 Blavignac (48026)
 Le Born (48029)
 Bourgs sur Colagne (48099)
 Brenoux (48030)
 Brion (48031)
 Le Buisson (48032)
 La Canourgue (48034)
 Chadenet (48037)
 Chanac (48039)
 Chastanier (48041)
 Chastel-Nouvel (48042)
 Châteauneuf-de-Randon (48043)
 Chauchailles (48044)
 Chaudeyrac (48045)
 Chaulhac (48046)
 Cheylard-l'Évêque (48048)
 Cubières (48053)
 Cubiérettes (48054)
 Cultures (48055)
 Esclanèdes (48056)
 La Fage-Montivernoux (48058)
 La Fage-Saint-Julien (48059)
 Fontans (48063)
 Fournels (48064)
 Gabrias (48068)
 Grandrieu (48070)
 Grandvals (48071)
 Grèzes (48072)
 Les Hermaux (48073)
 Julianges (48077)
 Lachamp-Ribennes (48126)
 Lajo (48079)
 Langogne (48080)
 Lanuéjols (48081)
 Laubert (48082)
 Les Laubies (48083)
 Laval-du-Tarn (48085)
 Luc (48086)
 Le Malzieu-Forain (48089)
 Le Malzieu-Ville (48090)
 Marchastel (48091)
 Marvejols (48092)
 Mende (48095)
 Montbel (48100)
 Mont Lozère et Goulet (48027)
 Montrodat (48103)
 Monts-de-Randon (48127)
 Les Monts-Verts (48012)
 Nasbinals (48104)
 Naussac-Fontanes (48105)
 Noalhac (48106)
 Palhers (48107)
 La Panouse (48108)
 Paulhac-en-Margeride (48110)
 Pelouse (48111)
 Peyre en Aubrac (48009)
 Pied-de-Borne (48015)
 Pierrefiche (48112)
 Pourcharesses (48117)
 Prévenchères (48119)
 Prinsuéjols-Malbouzon (48087)
 Prunières (48121)
 Recoules-d'Aubrac (48123)
 Recoules-de-Fumas (48124)
 Rimeize (48128)
 Rocles (48129)
 Saint-Alban-sur-Limagnole (48132)
 Saint-André-Capcèze (48135)
 Saint-Bauzile (48137)
 Saint-Bonnet-de-Chirac (48138)
 Saint-Bonnet-Laval (48139)
 Saint-Chély-d'Apcher (48140)
 Saint-Denis-en-Margeride (48145)
 Sainte-Eulalie (48149)
 Sainte-Hélène (48157)
 Saint-Étienne-du-Valdonnez (48147)
 Saint-Flour-de-Mercoire (48150)
 Saint-Frézal-d'Albuges (48151)
 Saint-Gal (48153)
 Saint-Germain-du-Teil (48156)
 Saint-Jean-la-Fouillouse (48160)
 Saint-Juéry (48161)
 Saint-Laurent-de-Muret (48165)
 Saint-Laurent-de-Veyrès (48167)
 Saint-Léger-de-Peyre (48168)
 Saint-Léger-du-Malzieu (48169)
 Saint-Paul-le-Froid (48174)
 Saint-Pierre-de-Nogaret (48175)
 Saint-Pierre-le-Vieux (48177)
 Saint-Privat-du-Fau (48179)
 Saint-Saturnin (48181)
 Saint-Sauveur-de-Ginestoux (48182)
 Les Salces (48187)
 Les Salelles (48185)
 Serverette (48188)
 Termes (48190)
 La Tieule (48191)
 Trélans (48192)
 Villefort (48198)

History

The arrondissement of Mende was created in 1800.

As a result of the reorganisation of the cantons of France which came into effect in 2015, the borders of the cantons are no longer related to the borders of the arrondissements. The cantons of the arrondissement of Mende were, as of January 2015:

 Aumont-Aubrac
 Le Bleymard
 La Canourgue
 Chanac
 Châteauneuf-de-Randon
 Fournels
 Grandrieu
 Langogne
 Le Malzieu-Ville
 Marvejols
 Mende-Nord
 Mende-Sud
 Nasbinals
 Saint-Alban-sur-Limagnole
 Saint-Amans
 Saint-Chély-d'Apcher
 Saint-Germain-du-Teil
 Villefort

References

Mende